The Commonwealth Athletic Conference (CAC) is a high school athletic conference in District A of the Massachusetts Interscholastic Athletic Association (MIAA).

Sports 
The following sports are supported by the Commonwealth Athletic Conference.

Member schools

Current members
The following twelve schools are a member of the Commonwealth Athletic Conference.

Former members

References

 
Massachusetts Interscholastic Athletic Association leagues
Sports in Essex County, Massachusetts
Sports in Middlesex County, Massachusetts
|}